Sparganothoides hydeana is a species of moth of the family Tortricidae. It is found from the mountains of Arizona, Colorado and New Mexico in the United States south to Puebla in Mexico. The habitat consists of coniferous forests, pinyon-juniper, oak-cottonwood, and willow-Rhus associations.

The length of the forewings is 10.4–11.7 mm. The ground color of the forewings is brownish yellow to brown, with an indistinct pattern of orange, brownish orange and/or reddish brown scaling. The hindwings are yellowish grey to grey. Adults have been recorded on wing from June to September.

The larvae probably feed on a wide range of plants, but possibly prefer Quercus and Arctostaphylos species.  They web the edges of the leaves of their host. They are reddish brown.

References

Moths described in 1936
Sparganothoides